Nightdreamers is an original novella written by Tom Arden and based on the long-running British science fiction television series Doctor Who. It features the Third Doctor and Jo. It was released both as a standard edition hardback and a deluxe edition featuring a frontispiece by Martin McKenna. Both editions have a foreword by Katy Manning.

Plot
A royal wedding on an otherwise pleasant moon goes wild. Romantic entanglements give way to fare more dangerous difficulties. Including gravity itself.

2002 British novels
2002 science fiction novels
Doctor Who novellas
British science fiction novels
Telos Publishing books